Santa Ursula (Spanish: Santa Úrsula) is a large, lower class suburb in Coyoacan, Mexico City. Most notable about the neighborhood is the Estadio Azteca,  home stadium to the prominent football clubs América and Cruz Azul. It was the venue for association football during the 1968 Summer Olympics; although it was not an Olympic stadium. Near the neighborhood there are 2 light-rail stations. A few cul-de-sacs, low-rise apartments, gated communities and a Pepsi factory are present in the neighborhood.

Education
Public high schools of the Instituto de Educación Media Superior del Distrito Federal (IEMS) include:
Escuela Preparatoria Coyoacán "Ricardo Flores Magón" (Viejo Ejido de Santa Úrsula)

See also
Estadio Azteca

References

Neighborhoods in Mexico City